Khuzankola (also Romanized as Khūzankolā, Khozan Kolah, Khūzan-e Kalāyeh, and Khūzan Kalā) is a village in Adaran Rural District, Asara District, Karaj County, Alborz Province, Iran. At the 2006 census, its population was 358, in 114 families.

References 

Populated places in Karaj County